= Kimberly Agnew =

Kimberley Agnew is the daughter of vice president Spiro Agnew and second lady Judy Agnew

|name= Elinor Kimberley Agnew
